Tha Sai is a tambon (subdistrict) of Mueang Chiang Rai District, in Chiang Rai Province, Thailand. In 2005 it had a population of 8,412 people. The tambon contains 13 villages.

References

Tambon of Chiang Rai province
Populated places in Chiang Rai province